43 Sagittarii is a single star in the southern constellation of Sagittarius. It has the Bayer designation d Sagittarii, while 43 Sagittarii is the Flamsteed designation. This object is visible to the naked eye as a faint, yellow-hued star with an apparent visual magnitude of 4.88. From parallax measurements, it is estimated to lie around 470 light years away from the Sun. The star is drifting further from the Earth with a heliocentric radial velocity of +15.2 km/s. It is located near the ecliptic and thus is subject to lunar occultations.

This is an aging giant/bright giant star with a stellar classification of G8II-III, and is most likely (97% chance) on the horizontal branch. It is around 350 million years old with 3.3 times the mass of the Sun. Having exhausted the supply of hydrogen at its core, the star has expanded to 24 times the Sun's radius and is now generating energy through core helium fusion. It is radiating 277 times the luminosity of the Sun from its swollen photosphere at an effective temperature of 4,813 K.

References

G-type bright giants
G-type giants
Horizontal-branch stars

Sagittarius (constellation)
Sagittarii, d
BD-19 5379
Sagittarii, 43
180540
094820
7304